The soundtrack album for the second season of HBO series Game of Thrones, titled Game of Thrones: Season 2, was published on June 19, 2012. The instrumental music by Ramin Djawadi was performed by the Czech Film Orchestra and Choir and recorded at the Rudolfinum concert hall in Prague.

Reception
The soundtrack received mostly positive reviews. Tracksoundss review was again mixed, describing the score as little more than adequate. Noting a lack of thematic development or dramatic momentum, the reviewer nonetheless appreciated the score's more subdued moments, which he considered less forced than the rest of the track.

Track listing

Credits and personnel
Personnel adapted from the album liner notes.

 David Benioff – liner notes
 Brandon Campbell – technical score advisor
 Ramin Djawadi – composer, primary artist, producer
 Dave Klotz – music editor
 Matt Berninger – producer
 Pavel Ciboch – copyist
 Stephen Coleman – orchestration
 Czech Film Chorus – choir/chorus
 Czech Film Orchestra – orchestra

 Aaron Dessner – producer
 Patricia Sullivan Fourstar – mastering
 Evyen J. Klean – music supervisor, producer
 D.B. Weiss – liner notes 
 Janet Lopez – music coordinator
 George R.R. Martin – lyricist
 The National – band, primary artist
 Zdenka Pelikanova – music contractor
 Robert Townson – executive producer
 Catherine Wilson – technical score advisor

Awards and nominations

References

Ramin Djawadi soundtracks
2012 soundtrack albums
Soundtrack
Classical music soundtracks
Instrumental soundtracks
Television soundtracks
Varèse Sarabande soundtracks